Joseph Oscar Lefebre Boulanger (born November 3, 1888 in Saint-Charles-de-Bellechasse, Quebec, Canada-died July 21, 1958) was a Canadian politician and lawyer. He was elected to the House of Commons of Canada in 1926 as a Member of the Liberal Party to represent the riding of Bellechasse. He was re-elected in 1930 and in 1935.

See also
Politics of Canada

External links
 

1888 births
1958 deaths
Liberal Party of Canada MPs
Members of the House of Commons of Canada from Quebec